Oplurus cuvieri, commonly known as the collared iguana, the collared iguanid lizard, Cuvier's Madagascar skink, Cuvier's Madagascar swift, and the Madagascan collared iguana, is a species of arboreal lizard in the family Opluridae. The species is native to Madagascar and Comoros. There are two recognized subspecies. O. cuvieri is the largest of six species in the genus Oplurus.

Etymology
The specific name, cuvieri, is in honor of French naturalist Georges Cuvier.

Description
As some of the common names suggest, O. cuvieri has a distinctive black collar that stands out against the body which is speckled with lighter spots.  It has a large head, and the relatively short tail has spiny scales. The female is a duller brown colour.

The images below show considerable variation in markings and coloration.

Geographic range
The collared iguana is found in the western tropical forests of Madagascar and on the island of Grand Comore in Comoros.

Subspecies
Two subspecies are recognized as being valid, including the nominotypical subspecies.
Oplurus cuvieri cuvieri  – Madagascar
Oplurus cuvieri comorensis  – Grand Comore Island

Nota bene: A trinomial authority in parentheses indicates that the subspecies was originally described in a genus other than Oplurus.

Diet
O. cuvieri has a mostly carnivorous diet.

Reproduction
Breeding of O. cuvieri is timed with the rainy season.

References

Further reading
Boulenger GA (1885). Catalogue of the Lizards in the British Museum (Natural History). Second Edition. Volume II. Iguanidæ ... London: Trustees of the British Museum (Natural History). (Taylor and Francis, printers). xiii + 497 pp. + Plates I-XXIV. (Hoplurus sebæ, p. 129-130).
Gray JE (1831). "A Synopsis of the Species of the Class Reptilia". In: Griffith E (1831). The Animal Kingdom Arranged in Conformity with its Organization, by the Baron Cuvier, with Additional Descriptions of All the Species hitherto Named, and of Many not before Noticed. Volume the Ninth. London: Whittaker, Treacher, and Co. 448 pp. + 110 pp. (Tropidurus cuvieri, p. 41 of 110 pp. supplement).
Savage JM (1952). "The Correct Names for the Iguanid Lizards of Madagascar and the Fiji Islands". Copeia 1952 (3): 182. (Oplurus cuvieri, new combination).

Oplurus
Reptiles of Madagascar
Endemic fauna of Madagascar
Taxa named by John Edward Gray
Reptiles described in 1831